Alejandro Costoya Rodríguez (born 6 May 1993) is a Spanish handball player who plays for Chambéry SMBH and the Spanish team.

He participated at the 2017 World Men's Handball Championship.

References

1993 births
Living people
People from Avilés
Spanish male handball players
Liga ASOBAL players
CB Ademar León players
Competitors at the 2018 Mediterranean Games
Mediterranean Games bronze medalists for Spain
Mediterranean Games medalists in handball